Madison Reef is a series of submerged rock shoals about 1.65 miles (2.65 kilometers) long and one mile (1.6 kilometers) offshore of Madison in New Haven County, Connecticut. It is between four and seventeen feet (1.21 and 5.18 meters) deep, and separated by channels of deeper water. Charles Reef is to the south and west. A cable passes through the reef on the seafloor.

See also
Round Rock, Madison
Tuxis Island
Gull Rock, Madison
Thimble Islands
Charles Reef
Outer Lands

References

Landforms of New Haven County, Connecticut
Shoals of the United States
Madison, Connecticut